Thank God for Girls may refer to:

Thank God for Girls (album), by Benny Mardones in 1978
"Thank God for Girls" (song), by Weezer in 2015